is a Japanese screenwriter and manga artist. She is best known for illustrating the Sorcerer Hunters manga series, which was based on the light novels written by Satoru Akahori, and which was adapted into an anime series. Her other works include Omishi Magical Theater: Risky Safety and Maze.

Works

References

Living people
Year of birth missing (living people)